A referendum on a reorganisation of local government was held in the Northern Mariana Islands on 7 November 1987. The proposal was approved by voters.

Background
The proposed reorganisation of local government was a legislative initiative passed by a 75% majority in both houses of the Legislature. As a result, only a simply majority of votes was required for the proposals to pass.

The proposals involved a complete rewrite of Chapter VI of the constitution, which defined the rights, duties and electoral system for local government.

References

Northern Mariana Islands
1987 in the Northern Mariana Islands
Referendums in the Northern Mariana Islands
Election and referendum articles with incomplete results